Louise Lucelia Clapp (May 12, 1934 – October 17, 1967) was a pitcher who played in the All-American Girls Professional Baseball League. She batted and threw right-handed.

Little is known about this player who saw action in the All-American Girls Professional Baseball League during the 1954 season.

Clapp split the year between the Fort Wayne Daisies and South Bend Blue Sox teams. She hurled five innings of ball in three pitching appearances.

The league folded at the end of the season. Clapp was not located after that.

She is part of Women in Baseball, a permanent display based at the Baseball Hall of Fame and Museum in Cooperstown, New York, which was unveiled in 1988 to honor the entire All-American Girls Professional Baseball League.

Sources
 

All-American Girls Professional Baseball League players
Fort Wayne Daisies players
South Bend Blue Sox players
Baseball players from Cleveland
People from Harrod, Ohio
1934 births
1967 deaths
20th-century American women
20th-century American people